Sutlaq (also Romanized as Sūtlaq; also known as Sūltaq) is a village in Qolqol Rud Rural District, Qolqol Rud District, Tuyserkan County, Hamadan Province, Iran. At the 2006 census, its population was 1,004, in 226 families.

References 

Populated places in Tuyserkan County